The Little Saganash River is a river in Cochrane District in northeastern Ontario, Canada. It is in the James Bay drainage basin, and is a right tributary of the Saganash River.

Course
The river begins at a small, unnamed lake in geographic Casselman Township, between Swanson Road and Chain of Lakes Road. It flows northwest into geographic Staples Township, turns north then again northwest. The river flows into geographic Sulman Township, and reaches its mouth at the Saganash River. The Saganash River flows via the Kapuskasing River, the Mattagami River and the Moose River to James Bay.

References

Sources

Rivers of Cochrane District